State Route 223 (SR 223) is a state route in Madison County, Tennessee. It runs from SR 138 near Mercer to I-40, just west of Jackson. The highway is the main access road for McKellar-Sipes Regional Airport, the regional airport for Jackson and the surrounding areas. Also, TDOT's Region 4 office is located at the highway's interchange with I-40.

Route description

SR 223 begins as Shady Grove Road just east of Mercer at an intersection with SR 138. It goes northeast through farmland and wooded areas to pass through Denmark, where it makes a sharp right turn onto Denmark Jackson Road. It then continues north through rural areas to come to a Y-Intersection, where it turns off of Denmark Jackson Road onto Smith Lane. SR 223 then enters then city limits of Jackson, where it passes by McKellar-Sipes Regional Airport and Tennessee College of Applied Technology at Jackson (TCAT) before coming to an intersection with US 70/SR 1. SR 223 then continues north through farmland before coming to an end at an interchange with I-40 (Exit 76).

The portion from the southern terminus to the airport is a rural 2 lane highway and the part from the airport to the northern terminus is a 4-lane divided highway and runs through a mixed rural/industrial area.

Major intersections

References

223
Transportation in Madison County, Tennessee